The Attorney General of the State of Maryland is the chief legal officer of the State of Maryland in the United States and is elected by the people every four years with no term limits. To run for the office a person must be a citizen of and qualified voter in Maryland and must have lived and practiced law in the state for at least ten years.

The attorney general has general charge, supervision and direction of the legal business of the State. The attorney general is the legal advisor and representative of the Governor, the General Assembly, the Judiciary, and the major departments, various boards, commissions, officials and institutions of State Government. The office further represents the State in all cases pending in the Appellate Courts of the State, and in the United States Supreme Court and lower Federal Courts. As of 2023, the attorney general is Democrat Anthony Brown.

Summary of powers 

 The Attorney General serves as legal counsel to the Governor, the Legislature, and all State departments, boards, and most commissions.
 The Attorney General may bring an action to restrain a foreign limited liability company from doing business in this State.
 The Attorney General may obtain a court order prohibiting the guarantor or service contract provider from further violations in this State.

List of the attorneys general of Maryland

References

External links 
 Maryland Attorney General official website
 About the office and list of Attorneys General of Maryland, from the Maryland Archives.
 Maryland Attorney General articles at ABA Journal
 News and Commentary at FindLaw
 Maryland Code at Law.Justia.com
 U.S. Supreme Court Opinions – "Cases with title containing: State of Maryland" at FindLaw
 Maryland State Bar Association
 Maryland Attorney General Brian Frosh profile at National Association of Attorneys General
 Press releases at Maryland Attorney General